There is also another company, within the EURONEXT group, with the same name that is based in Portugal. this company, is responsible for the central securities depository and settlement systems management in Portugal.

InterBolsa formerly the Interbolsa Financial Group now largely known as Grupo InterBolsa, was a Colombian based securities broker (largest in Colombia) and proprietary trader that also engaged in asset management and other types of investment banking, that operated until November 2012, when the Colombian Government ordered its closure by a default of debts with the local banking system. The group still has other investments and companies overseas whose operations may not be interrupted by this closure.

The company had over 29% of the market volume of brokerage activity in Colombia.

History

Until 2008, it operated as a loosely integrated conglomerate with a controlling interest in a number of smaller companies, each specializing in a different region (Panama) or product (InterBolsa Futures). In 2009, after it made a move into the Brazilian market when it acquired all of Finabank for US$21 million it officially organized itself into a holding company called Grupo InterBolsa.

Subsidiaries

Interbolsa Comisionista de Bolsa

Administradora de Inversión – Asset Manager that oversees Colombia's first private capital energy fund; InterBolsa Energético which was established in April 2009.

Interbolsa Panama

Finabank – Brazilian securities broker 90% owned by InterBolsa. Has repo operations.

Fundación InterBolsa – organizes corporate responsibility programs for the group of companies.

References

Investment companies of Colombia
Investment banks
Venture capital firms